Bouzy-la-Forêt is a commune in the Loiret département in north-central France.

Population

See also
Communes of the Loiret department

References

External links

Official site

Communes of Loiret